Hung Hom Ferry Pier is a ferry pier in Hung Hom, Kowloon, Hong Kong. It is at the reclaimed Hung Hom Bay at the south of Lily Mansion (Phase 9), Whampoa Garden.

History 
The original pier, opened in 1979 using Streamline Moderne design from the Star Ferry terminals at Central and Tsim Sha Tsui, was located near the Hung Hom Station, close to the current position of Metropolis Tower. In 1988, the pier was temporarily relocated to the seaside of Hunghom Bay Centre to cope with Hung Hom Bay Reclamation Project. When the project was completed in 1991, the pier was moved to the current location.
It opened in March 1991.

Ferry routes 
East berth
Hung Hom - North Point (operated by Sun Ferry)
West berth
Hung Hom - Central (operated by Fortune Ferry)

Public Transport Interchange
The former Hung Hom Ferry Pier Public Transport Interchange, a large bus terminus outside the pier, was replaced by the Hung Hom (Hung Luen Road) Public Transport Interchange, located inside the nearby Kerry Hotel. MTR Whampoa station exit C2.

References

External links

 Ng Yuk-hang (31 March 2011)- "End of the line for Hung Hom ferry routes", South China Morning Post, p. C1.

Transport infrastructure completed in 1965
Transport infrastructure completed in 1988
Transport infrastructure completed in 1991
Piers in Hong Kong
Hung Hom
Victoria Harbour
Star Ferry
1865 establishments in Hong Kong
Streamline Moderne architecture in Hong Kong